Ouyang Zhongshi (October 1928 – 5 November 2020) was a Chinese actor, calligrapher, and singer.

Biography
He was director of Chinese Calligraphers Association and associate professor in Capital Normal University. Graduated from high school, Ouyang Zhongshi studied at Fu Jen Catholic University which merged into Beijing Normal University in 1952. A year later, he transferred to Philosophy Department of Peking University. His tutor was the Chinese philosopher and logician, Jin Yuelin. After graduating from Peking University in 1954, he started his teaching career in middle schools. In 1982, he was transferred to Beijing Teachers’ School, which now is Capital Normal University, to teach calligraphy. In 2013 Zhongshi was the winner of the gold medal for the first Confucius Art Prize, an addition to the Confucius Peace Prize.

He died on 5 November 2020, aged 92.

References

1928 births
2020 deaths
20th-century Chinese calligraphers
20th-century Chinese male actors
20th-century Chinese  male singers
21st-century Chinese calligraphers
Artists from Shandong
Academic staff of the Capital Normal University
Chinese male Peking opera actors
Fu Jen Catholic University alumni
Male actors from Shandong
People's Republic of China calligraphers
Peking University alumni
People from Feicheng
Singers from Shandong